Tang Jingxing (18321892), also known as Tang Tingshu, was a Chinese comprador, interpreter, and businessman during the late Qing dynasty. Born in Xiangshan, Guangdong province, he studied in Robert Morrison's missionary schools as a boy and his classmates included Yung Wing. Because of the knowledge of English he obtained employment in the Hong Kong colonial government between 1851–57 and 1857–61, he served the Chinese Maritime Customs Service as interpreter and chief secretary. In 1861, he joined the Jardine Matheson Company, initially as a travelling salesman, visiting the various Yangtze River ports. In 1863 he was promoted and appointed Jardine Mathesion's Compradore in Shanghai. He was so successful in developing the company's trade he was soon made Chief Compradore  responsible for all the company's compradores in other Chinese ports. Tang authored the work The Chinese Instructor, a six-volume series of dialogues, published in 1862.

Tang is mainly known for his participation in a number of officially sponsored commercial projects during the last decades of the Qing dynasty, collectively known as enterprises under "official supervision and merchant management". Between 1873-84 he served as the general manager of China Merchants' Steam Navigation Company in Shanghai, after which he worked in the coalmines in Kaiping in Zhili until his death in 1892. In Tangshan near Kaiping he was also a promoter of the Kaiping Tramway.

References

Sources
Carlson, Ellsworth C. The Kaiping Mines, 1877-1912. 2d ed. Cambridge, MA: East Asian Research Center, 1971.

Businesspeople from Guangdong
Qing dynasty translators
Hong Kong businesspeople
Hong Kong politicians
1832 births
1892 deaths
Politicians from Zhongshan
Writers from Zhongshan